The 2011 Discovery Women’s Basketball Invitational was an invitational basketball tournament which was contested by the women's national teams of the Philippines and Qatar along with Bangkok Bank of Thailand and a selection team from Fujian of China. The tournament hosted by Bacolod took place at the West Negros University Gym from September 28-October 1.

Results

Preliminary round

Third place match

Final

Awards

References

Discovery Women's Basketball Invitational
2011 in women's basketball
2011–12 in Asian basketball
2011–12 in Philippine basketball
2011–12 in Chinese basketball
2011–12 in Thai basketball
2011 in Qatari sport
Bask
Bask
Bask